Gregory VII may refer to:

Pope Gregory VII (c. 1015–1085)
Catholicos Gregory VII of Cilicia (r. 1293–1307)
Patriarch Gregory VII of Constantinople (r. 1923–1924)